André Gusperti (born 14 October 1973) is an Italian former swimmer. He was a world class butterfly swimmer during the 1990s.

Biography
He began swimming in Rari Nantes Trento and later joined Fiamme Gialle (the Athletic Team of Guardia di Finanza). During the nineties Gusperti competed in several international events. He swam in the winning 4 × 100 m medley relay at the 1997 Mediterranean Games (Merisi, Fioravanti, A. Gusperti, Rosolino). He participated to the world swimming championship in Perth 1998. He is the brother of René Gusperti, another renowned former Italian swimmer.

References

1973 births
Living people
People from Schlanders
Italian male butterfly swimmers
Swimmers at the 1997 Mediterranean Games
Mediterranean Games gold medalists for Italy
Mediterranean Games medalists in swimming
Sportspeople from Südtirol
20th-century Italian people
21st-century Italian people